Beatton Provincial Park is a provincial park in the Peace River Country of northeastern British Columbia, Canada.

It is located on the Eastern shores of Charlie Lake approximately sixteen kilometers from Fort St John, BC. The 320 hectare provincial park offers facilities that include vehicle accessible camping, boat launch, drinking water, picnic area, pit toilets, playground and a large trail system. The provincial campground only operates between May and September, but the park trail system is open year-round.
The park's large trail network is maintained by the Whiskey Jack Nordic Ski Club and is used for cross-country skiing and snowshoeing in the winter and hiking in the summer. There are over 20 km of groomed cross-country ski trails designed for beginner, intermediate and advancing skiers and a toboggan hill located near the parking at the main gate.

See also
Beatton River Provincial Park

References

External links
Beatton Provincial Park

Peace River Country
Provincial parks of British Columbia
Year of establishment missing